Russ Wetmore is an American computer programmer and video game designer best known for writing commercial games and applications for the Atari 8-bit family in the early to mid 1980s. His Frogger-inspired Preppie! was published by Adventure International as well as its sequel. He stopped writing games after the video game crash of 1983 and developed the integrated HomePak productivity suite for Batteries Included.

Education 
Interested in classical music, Wetmore majored in music composition at Morehead State University, from 1973–1975, until running out of money.

Game development 
Wetmore met Scott Adams in 1981 and was hired to work for Adventure International as a liaison for external game authors. When he became interested in developing his own games, Adams loaned him an Atari 800.

Wetmore's first commercial game was Preppie! (1982) for the Atari 8-bit computers, which merges the design of Frogger with the preppy fad of the early 1980s. He designed and programmed its maze-game sequel, Preppie! II (1983), and ported Sea Dragon from the TRS-80 (1982). All three games were developed under the name Star Systems Software and published by Adventure International. "By Russ Wetmore" was prominently displayed on the box cover for Preppie! and Preppie! II, resulting in Wetmore becoming a recognized name in Atari game programming.

Following his appearance on the ANTIC Podcast in January 2016, Wetmore released the Atari 8-bit source code for Preppie, Preppie II, and Sea Dragon to the Internet Archive. Also made available was a demo for an unfinished Atari 8-bit game, Lulu.

After games
As a result of the video game crash of 1983, Wetmore stopped writing games and created the integrated application suite HomePak (1984) for the Atari 8-bit computers. It contains a word processor (HomeText), database (HomeFind), and terminal communications program (HomeTerm). HomePak was published by Batteries Included. It is one of the few commercial products written in the Action! programming language from Optimized Systems Software.

With Sparky Starks, Wetmore co-authored HomeCard, an Atari 8-bit application advertised as an "electronic filing box" and "intelligent Rolodex." It was published by Antic Software in 1985.

Wetmore wrote a short-lived column for Atari computer magazine ANALOG Computing called "On-Line" which first appeared in the May 1985 issue.

He has since worked as a software architect and director of software development for a variety of companies, including Apple Computer.

References

American computer programmers
Video game designers
Video game programmers
Living people
1956 births